Enzo Cabrera may refer to:

 Enzo Cabrera (footballer, born 1985), Chilean midfielder for Audax Italiano
 Enzo Cabrera (footballer, born 1999), Argentine forward for Newell's Old Boys